Ricky Dobbs (born January 31, 1988) is a United States Navy officer and former college football quarterback for the United States Naval Academy. During the 2009 season he broke the single season college football record for most rushing touchdowns by a quarterback with 27.

High school
Dobbs was known as  "the Mayor" by his teachers at Douglas County High School in Douglasville, Georgia. He was the recipient of the Faculty Cup at his commencement ceremony in 2006. Dobbs was also voted Homecoming King & Mr.DCHS by his peers.

He had an offer to play wide receiver for Georgia Tech, but chose Navy in part because of medical benefits for himself and family as well as opportunities beyond football and service to his country.

College football career
Dobbs ran the triple option offense for the Navy Midshipmen.

2008 season
Dobbs rushed for 499 yards and eight touchdowns. Navy was honored at the White House in April 2009 for winning a sixth straight Commander-in-Chief's Trophy, and Dobbs said he autographed a helmet presented to President Barack Obama five times "so Obama would remember him".

2009 season

During his first full year as a starter, Dobbs rushed for more than 1,000 yards and had 1031 passing yards and six  passing touchdowns. The team had the second best rushing offense in terms of yards.

Dobbs missed one game and most of another with a broken bone in his knee. Navy beat Notre Dame, but lost to Hawaii.

Dobbs tied Tim Tebow's record 23 rushing touchdowns for a quarterback on November 27.

On December 12 against arch rival Army, Dobbs ran for his 24th rushing touchdown on the season, making him at the time the record holder for most rushing touchdowns by a quarterback in a single season.

Navy played in the Texas Bowl on December 31 against Missouri, their seventh straight bowl game. Dobbs ran for 166 yards and three touchdowns in the game and completed 9 of 14 passes for 130 yards and a fourth touchdown in a 35–13 victory. Dobbs finished with the NCAA record of 27 single-season quarterback rushing touchdowns and was named the game's MVP.

His final collegiate game was the 2011 East–West Shrine Game.

Since his graduation, TV announcers have gotten Dobbs to be a special guest caller while on board his current ship during a few of the televised Navy Midshipmen's football games in 2012 and 2013, giving the viewers an update on his career.

Naval career
After graduating the Naval Academy on May 27, 2011, Dobbs, who had studied to be a surface warfare officer, received his choice assignment of wanting to be on a destroyer.

At his request, Dobbs was assigned to the USS Oscar Austin, a sophisticated Arleigh Burke class destroyer named after an African-American Marine who received the Medal of Honor for heroic conduct, losing his life while attempting to save the life of a fellow Marine in the Vietnam War.
During his 2 ½-year tour aboard the ship, deployed off the coast of Somalia, Dobbs served as an ensign and main propulsion division officer, and performed maritime security operations.

During the televised 2014 Navy vs. Western Kentucky game, CBS Sports Network commentators John Sadak and Randy Cross announced while in a sponsored Bass Pro Shops segment entitled "Where are they now?" that Dobbs is still serving his 5-year commitment currently on board the USS Sirocco, a Cyclone-class patrol ship bound for Bahrain. He spent 18 months aboard the ship serving as operations officer, executive officer, legal officer, and navigator as the vessel performed coastal patrol and interdiction surveillance in the region.

Currently, Dobbs is stationed at the Naval Academy through the end of 2017, working as a recruiting counselor in the admissions office. He holds the title of Candidate Guidance Officer for the states of Florida, Georgia, South Carolina, Puerto Rico and the Virgin Islands.

He's undecided whether he will remain in the service or process out upon completion of his assignment. However, Dobbs does still dream of playing professional football, whether in the NFL or the CFL. He also has aspirations to run for U.S. President in 2040.

Professional career
In 2012 and 2013, while still serving in the Navy, Dobbs played semi-pro football for the Virginia Cyclones. The Naval Academy graduate still has aspirations to get a chance to try out for the NFL someday and run for the U.S. presidency.

In 2018, Dobbs participated in the American Flag Football League, serving as captain of the Primetime team.

Personal
Dobbs was born in Atlanta, Georgia and is the son of an electrician and a beautician. He has said that he wants to be the second African-American quarterback to win a Super Bowl, and his birthday, January 31, 1988, coincidentally is the same day that Doug Williams of the Washington Redskins achieved this feat in Super Bowl XXII. He is friends with Williams and NFL quarterback Shaun King.

One of Dobbs' idols is President Barack Obama. He was vice president of USNA class of 2011. He said that he wanted to become the first black president, but after Obama was elected, has stated "I guess I'll be the second now." He has a five-year military commitment after graduation.

On June 13, 2010, Dobbs was awarded a key to his hometown of Douglasville, Georgia by  mayor Mickey Thompson. The day was also declared "Ricky Dobbs Day" in the city.

As of 2016, Dobbs is an assistant coach for an 11 and under football team fielded by the Peninsula Athletic League.

References

External links

Navy Midshipmen bio

1988 births
Living people
American football quarterbacks
Navy Midshipmen football players
Players of American football from Atlanta
United States Navy officers